The 2019 UNTV Cup PBA Legends Face-Off was the 4th off-season tournament of the annual charity basketball league in the Philippines, UNTV Cup. It is the first off-season games that featured PBA teams (although composed of alumni players), and a follow-up to the successful reunion charity event PBA Legends: Return of the Rivals last February 17, 2019. The tournament was organized by UNTV-37 Foundation, Inc., through its chairman and chief executive officer of BMPI-UNTV, Kuya Daniel Razon, more popularly known as Mr. Public Service.

The month-long tournament officially opened on June 2, 2019 at the Pasig City Sports Complex, Pasig, with four teams vying for the championship title. Regular games were held at the same venue with a delayed telecast on UNTV channel every Sunday afternoon.

A total of 2 million pesos tax-free was given to the PBA Legends Foundation Incorporated, with the champion team taking home a trophy and 1 million pesos donated to the institution.

This event marked the fourth time UNTV will be holding a tournament for the benefit of former basketball players. In 2015, the Skywalker Exhibition Game was held and benefited the legendary Samboy Lim of San Miguel Beer. In 2017, UNTV Cup founder Daniel Razon granted P1 million seed money to the PBA Legends Foundation after an exhibition game. In 2018, the foundation organized the first ever PBA Legends Charity Golf Tournament, and extended assistance to former player Joey Mente who succumbed to cancer, and ex-Crispa guard Johnny Revilla.

The finals game was held on July 8, 2019 at the Smart Araneta Coliseum. It was between the undefeated San Miguel Beermen and #2 team Alaska Milkmen. Alaska escaped San Miguel on a close battle, 77–75, to get the championship and donate 1 million pesos to the PBA Legends Foundation.

Teams
There were 4 squads who vied for the championship title of the off-season. PBA alumni players 40 years old and above are eligible to participate in the competition. All participants are returning teams from the successful reunion charity event PBA Legends: Return of the Rivals last February 17, 2019.

Alaska
The Alaska team is composed of the players listed below.
 #0 Braulio Lim
 #1 Eddie Laure
 #6 Jojo Lastimosa
 #7 Roehl Gomez
 #9 Rodney Santos
 #11 Willie Miller
 #14 Johnny Abarrientos
 #16 Bong Hawkins
 #19 Kenneth Duremdes
 #22 Jeffrey Cariaso
 #32 Poch Juinio
 #55 John Ferriols

Ginebra
The Ginebra team is composed of the players listed below.
 #1 Bal David
 #11 Bobby Jose
 #12 Vince Hizon
 #13 Marlou Aquino
 #13 Jayjay Helterbrand
 #16 Benny Cheng
 #17 Rudy Distrito
 #25 Pido Jarencio
 #28 Jun Marzan
 #32 E.J. Feihl
 #53 Mike Orquillas
 #55 Bennet Palad
 #74 Banjo Calpito

Purefoods
The Purefoods team is composed of the players listed below.
 #1 Bong Ravena
 #3 Bonel Balingit
 #5 Ronnie Magsanoc
 #6 Tony Boy Espinosa
 #10 Rommel Adducul
 #10 Dindo Pumaren
 #12 Glenn Capacio
 #13 Roger Yap
 #15 Dwight Lago
 #16 Alvin Patrimonio
 #19 Joey Santamaria
 #44 Jerry Codiñera
 #55 Richard Yee

San Miguel
The San Miguel team is composed of the players listed below.
 #3 Nic Belasco
 #6 Ato Agustin
 #7 Dondon Hontiveros
 #8 Allan Caidic
 #10 Danny Ildefonso
 #11 Nelson Asaytono
 #14 Gilbert Castillo
 #17 Olsen Racela
 #22 Arnold Gamboa
 #23 Bong Alvarez
 #24 Kiko Adriano
 #42 Danny Seigle
 #88 Chris Calaguio

Elimination round
The off season officially opened on June 2, 2019 at the Pasig City Sports Complex, Pasig, with four teams vying for the championship title. Regular games were held at the same venue with a delayed telecast on UNTV channel every Sunday afternoon.

Playoffs

Semifinals 
The playoffs began on June 23, 2019 at the Pasig City Sports Center in Pasig. 
The knockout stages present the #1 team face the #4 team, while #2 battles #3. Undefeated San Miguel and #2 Alaska holds a twice-to-beat advantage against winless Purefoods and #3 Ginebra, respectively.

(2) Alaska vs. (3) Ginebra

(1) San Miguel vs. (4) Purefoods

Battle for Third Place: (3) Ginebra vs. (4) Purefoods 
The battle for third place was between #3 Ginebra and #4 Purefoods, after they lost their semifinals series on separate opponents. Purefoods won the game, 98–75, after taking advantage of a tired Ginebra team in the fourth quarter. The Hotdogs got ₱300,000 for the PBA Legends Foundation as third placer. Despite the loss, Ginebra received ₱200,000 for charity as fourth placer.

PBA Legends Face-Off Finals: (1) San Miguel vs. (2) Alaska 
The finals game will be held on July 8, 2019 at the Smart Araneta Coliseum in Cubao, Quezon City. The championship is between the undefeated and #1 team San Miguel and #2 team Alaska. Alaska escaped San Miguel on a close battle, 77–75, to get the championship and donate 1 million pesos to the PBA Legends Foundation.

Winners and Beneficiaries

In total, the prize pool this season is 2 million pesos (₱2,000,000). The lone beneficiary for this off season is the PBA Legends Foundation, for the benefit of former professional basketball players who are either sick or in need of financial help. The champion team Alaska donates the ₱1 million top prize, the runner-up San Miguel gives ₱500,000, third place Purefoods ₱300,000, and Ginebra ₱200,000 as fourth placers.

Cumulative standings and head to head results

Elimination rounds

Playoffs

UNTV Cup Segments

Heart of a Champion
The Heart of a Champion segment features UNTV Cup players and their lives off the court as public servants.

Top Plays
The following segment features the top plays of the week.

Player and Fan Interviews
UNTV Cup PBA Legends Face Off players and fans share their thoughts in interviews.

See also
 UNTV Cup
 UNTV Public Service

References

External links 
 UNTVweb.com

Members Church of God International
2019 Philippine television series debuts
2019 in Philippine sport
UNTV Cup
UNTV (Philippines) original programming